In pharmacokinetics, the rate of infusion (or dosing rate) refers not just to the rate at which a drug is administered, but the desired rate at which a drug should be administered to achieve a steady state of a fixed dose which has been demonstrated to be therapeutically effective.

Abbreviations include Kin, K0, or R0.

It can be calculated as the steady-state concentration in the plasma multiplied by the clearance:

References

Pharmacokinetics
Infusion